Cold Lake 149B is an Indian reserve of the Cold Lake First Nations in Alberta, located within the Municipal District of Bonnyville No. 87. It is south of the Beaver River, a short distance northwest of the city of Cold Lake.

References

Indian reserves in Alberta